Danil Igorevich Prutsev (born 25 March 2000; some sources incorrectly list his first name as Daniil or Danila) is a Russian football player who plays as a central midfielder for Russian Premier League club Spartak Moscow.

Club career
He made his debut in the Russian Professional Football League for FC Chertanovo Moscow on 3 August 2017 in a game against FC Dynamo-2 Saint Petersburg. He made his Russian Football National League debut for Chertanovo on 17 July 2018 in a game against FC Rotor Volgograd.

On 2 September 2020, he moved to Russian Premier League club PFC Sochi. He made his RPL debut for Sochi on 12 September 2020 in a game against FC Akhmat Grozny.

On 16 July 2021, he returned to PFC Krylia Sovetov Samara.

On 21 January 2022, Danil signed for Spartak Moscow with a contract until 2026. He scored his first goal in the Russian Premier League on 12 November 2022 in a 1-2 win against Lokomotiv Moscow.

International career
Prutsev was called up to the Russia national football team for the first time in March 2023 for a training camp.

Personal life
His younger brother Yegor Prutsev is also a footballer.

Honours
Spartak Moscow
Russian Cup: 2021–22

Career statistics

References

External links
 
 
 
 Profile by Russian Professional Football League

2000 births
People from Mostovsky District
Living people
Russian footballers
Russia youth international footballers
Russia under-21 international footballers
Association football midfielders
FC Chertanovo Moscow players
PFC Krylia Sovetov Samara players
PFC Sochi players
FC Spartak Moscow players
Russian Premier League players
Russian First League players
Russian Second League players
Sportspeople from Krasnodar Krai